The African Diaspora International Film Festival (ADIFF) (originally African Diaspora Film Festival) was founded in 1992 by French-Malian Diarah N'Daw-Spech and her husband, Reinaldo Barroso-Spech, a Cuban of Haitian and Jamaican descent. As young cinema enthusiasts who rarely found movies that reflected their Black experiences, the couple founded ADIFF to showcase the lives and realities of people of African descent around the world. The festival is based in New York City and screens films from Europe, Latin America, Asia, and Africa. 

The thirtieth edition of the festival is set to take place from 25 November to 11 December 2022 and will feature 89 films from 44 countries.

References

External links
 

Film festivals in New York City
Film festivals established in 1992